Stephen William Brown (born 12 October 1963) is a New Zealand former cricketer. He played 53 first-class and 35 List A matches for Auckland between 1987 and 1995.

See also
 List of Auckland representative cricketers

References

External links
 

1963 births
Living people
New Zealand cricketers
Auckland cricketers
Cricketers from Hastings, New Zealand